Master of the André Virgin or Master of the André Madonna (1500 – ?) was a Southern-Netherlandish painter active in Bruges.

Little is known of his/her life. This painter is named after a work in the Musée Jacquemart-André showing a cityscape of Bruges.

References 

 record in the RKD
 Master of the André Virgin in the Oxford index

1500 births
16th-century deaths
Early Netherlandish painters
Artists from Bruges
Andre Virgin, Master of the